Northern Quarter may refer to:
Noorderkwartier (Holland)
Northern Quarter (Brussels)
Northern Quarter (Manchester)